FK Partizan is a professional football club based in Belgrade, Serbia. Founded in 1945, they were the first Yugoslav and Serbian club ever to enter European competition, playing the European Cup in the 1955–56 season. They opened the competition in a match against Sporting CP on 4 September 1955. They also became the first club that was not from Western Europe to play in the European Cup final, losing by Real Madrid in 1966.

Including all European competitions, midfielder Saša Ilić holds the club record for the most appearances with 114, and is also the club's third-highest ever goalscorer with 15 goals, behind Brazilian striker Cléo, who scored 16 goals, and Ricardo Gomes, who scored 20.

Best results in European competitions

 This match was played at Pod Goricom Stadium in Titograd instead of at Partizan's home ground in Belgrade since UEFA barred Partizan again from playing home matches within a 300 km radius of their home ground after more crowd trouble in the previous round's home tie against Groningen.
 This match was played at Krasnodar instead at Moscow due to poor weather conditions.
Biggest win in UEFA competition:

By competition

History

Yugoslav period: (1955–1991)

In Yugoslav period, Partizan made great success in European competitions. Certainly the greatest success was achieved in 1965–66 season, when Partizan's babies reached the 1966 European Cup final. During that period, Partizan played in European Cup, Inter-Cities Fairs Cup and UEFA Cup.

On 4 September 1955, Partizan participated in the first ever Champions Cup match, in Lisbon against Sporting CP. The final result was 3–3, with Miloš Milutinović becoming the first scorer in a most prestigious club competition in Europe. In return leg, Partizan defeated Sporting 5–2 and reached quarter-finals. Miloš Milutinović scored four goals on that match. In quarter-finals, Partizan played against Real Madrid (who later won the competition). In first match, Real Madrid defeated Partizan 4–0 in front of 105,000 fans at the Santiago Bernabéu Stadium. In return leg, Partizan won 3–0. Miloš Milutinović with eight goals was top scorer in European Cup.

The 1965–66 European Cup campaign was the crown of this generation's career. After eliminating French Nantes (2–0, 2–2) and German champion Werder Bremen (3–0, 1–0) in the first two rounds, Partizan were drawn against Sparta Prague in the quarter-finals. In the first leg, held in Prague, Partizan suffered a hard 4–1 defeat. Although they were not given any chances in the return leg in Belgrade, Partizan pulled off a convincing 5–0 win in front of 50,000 spectators, and with aggregate score 6–4 qualified for the semifinals. The semi-finals would see Partizan taking part in an emotional tie that would bring Manchester United, in their first season back in the European Cup after the Munich air disaster, returning to the scene of their final game, at the JNA Stadium, before embarking on that fateful journey home (on the way home from a European Cup quarter-final victory against Red Star, which was played at JNA Stadium, the aircraft carrying the Manchester United players, officials and journalists crashed while attempting to take off after refuelling in Munich).Manchester United, led by George Best and Bobby Charlton, awaited finally them on the last step to the finals. Partizan won the first leg at JNA Stadium 2–0,  and resisted the heavy pressure on Old Trafford, conceding only once; with a 2–1 aggregate scoreline, they eliminated the English giants. Partizan's babies achieved the greatest success in history of Partizan, a place in the 1966 European Cup final against Real Madrid. The final game was played on 11 May at Heysel Stadium, Brussels. Until the 70th minute, Partizan was 1–0 up through a goal by Velibor Vasović, but ultimately lost to the Spaniards 2–1. Partizan may have come close to a famous victory, but they had now missed their chance as the side was immediately broken up with their star players heading west. Still, Partizan became the first club from the Balkans and Eastern Europe to have played in a European Cup final.

Partizan finished the season in Yugoslav League on 11th place and did not play in next season in European competitions. In 1967–68 season, Partizan played first time in Inter-Cities Fairs Cup and eliminate Lokomotiv Plovdiv (5–1, 1–1) in first round, but they were stopped in second round by Leeds United (1–2, 1–1). Next season Partizan again not played in European competitions, but in next two season they were played in Inter-Cities Fairs Cup and eliminated in first round by Újpest Dózsa by an aggregate score of 2–3 and Dynamo Dresden, with an aggregate score of 0–6.

In 1974–75 season, Partizan played first time in UEFA Cup and reached third round. In first and second round, Partizan beat 5–2 on aggregate Górnik Zabrze and Portadown 6–1. In third round, they were eliminated by 1. FC Köln 2–5 on aggregate.

Partizan finished the 1974–75 in Yugoslav League on 6th place and did not play in next season in European competitions. In 1976–77 season, Partizan after eleven years played in European Cup. The first match after more than one decade, Partizan played in Kiev, versus Soviet Union champion Dynamo Kyiv and lost 0–3. Two weeks later, in Belgrade, Partizan played on Red Star Belgrade stadium, Marakana. The match was played on this stadium because of great interest. Partizan lost 0–2 in front of 70,000 fans.

Partizan also skipped one season in European competitions, because has finished on 4th place in league. In 1978–79 season, Partizan played against champion of East Germany, Dynamo Dresden. Partizan won first match 2–0 at home, but lost in Dresden also 2–0. Dynamo eliminated Partizan after a penalty shootout, 5–4.

Partizan qualified for 1983–84 European Cup, as champion of Yugoslavia. Partizan eliminated Norway champion Viking 5–1 on aggregate (5–1 at home, 0–0 in Stavanger). In second round, Dynamo Berlin eliminate Partizan 1–2 on aggregate (0–2 in Berlin, 1–0 at home).

In next season, Partizan has reached the success like of exactly a decade earlier, third round (round of 16) of UEFA Cup. In the first round, they were eliminated Rabat Ajax 4–0 on aggregate (2–0 on Malta, 2–0 at home). That away victory is first Partizan's victory in European competitions after 21 year. In the second round, Partizan eliminated Queens Park Rangers on away goals rule (6–6 on aggregate). QPR won the first leg 6–2, but Partizan advanced after a 4–0 return victory in Belgrade. A goal which Dragan Mance scored against the English side is considered as one of the most remarkable goals in the history of Partizan. That match was voted 70th among the Top 100 greatest matches in the history of football in a poll organized by Eurosport in September 2009. In the third round, Videoton eliminate Partizan 2–5 on aggregate. Videoton won 5–0 first leg in Székesfehérvár. Partizan won 2–0 in Belgrade, but that's victory was not enough to pass in quarter-finals. Next season, Partizan reached the second round of UEFA Cup, were they eliminated by Nantes 1–5 on aggregate (1–1 at home, 0–4 in Nantes). In first round, Partizan eliminated Portimonense 4–1 on aggregate (0–1 in Portimão, 4–0 at home).

In next two seasons, Partizan is eliminated in first round of UEFA Cup: in 1986–87 by Borussia Mönchengladbach 1–4 on aggregate, and in 1987–88 by Flamurtari 2–3 on aggregate. In 1988–89 season, Partizan eliminated Slavia Sofia 10–0 on aggregate (5–0 at home, 5–0 in Sofia). In the second round, they were stopped by Roma. First leg Partizan won 4–2, but in the second leg, Roma won 2–0 and eliminated Partizan on away goals rule.

As the national cup winners, they qualified for the 1989–90 European Cup Winners' Cup. In the first round, they were eliminated Celtic 6–6 on aggregate, on away goals rule. First match Partizan won 2–1 in Mostar, but lost in 4–5 Glasgow. The return match with Celtic is one of the most famous and most exciting in history of Partizan and Yugoslav football. In the second round they met with Groningen. The first leg Groningen won 4–3, but in Belgrade Partizan won 3–1 and secured place in quarter-finals. Dinamo București eliminate Partizan in quarter-finals 1–4 on aggregate (1–2 in Bucharest 0–2 in Titograd). The return leg was played at Pod Goricom Stadium in Titograd instead of at Partizan's home ground in Belgrade since UEFA barred Partizan again from playing home matches within a 300 km radius of their home ground after more crowd trouble in the previous round's home tie against Groningen.

In 1990–91 season, Partizan reached the third round of UEFA Cup. In the first round, they were eliminated Hibernians 5–0 on aggregate (3–0 on Malta, 2–0 at home). In the second round, Partizan eliminated Real Sociedad after a penalty shoot-out. Real Sociedad won the first leg 1–0 in San Sebastián, but Partizan after a 1–0 return victory in Belgrade and after a penalty shoot-out reached third round. In the third round, Internazionale eliminate Partizan 1–4 on aggregate. Inter won 3–0 first leg in Milan. Partizan drew 1–1 in Belgrade in the return leg.

The 1991–92 season was last season before UEFA ban on clubs from FR Yugoslavia. Partizan was eliminated in the first round by Sporting de Gijón. Sporting won the first leg in Gijón 2–0, but Partizan won two weeks later in Istanbul by the same result. Sporting eliminated Partizan after a penalty shoot-out. The return leg was played in Istanbul because of sanctions.

In Yugoslav period, the biggest Partizan's success was of course 1966 European Cup Final. In UEFA Cup, they reached third round (round of 16) three times and played one in European Cup Winners' Cup (1989–90), where they reached the quarterfinals. In that period, Partizan won 29 of 39 matches at home and only won 4 in away.

Dark decade (1990s) 
In 1997, Partizan was reintroduced to European competitions following the lift of the UEFA ban on clubs from FR Yugoslavia, but while the national team continued where they had stopped in the spring of 1992, the clubs had all their results erased and were treated as the beginners in the European competitions.

After the ban, Partizan entered in 1996–97 UEFA Cup. In the first match, the Black-Whites played on 17 July 1996 against Maccabi Haifa and won 1–0 by Đorđe Svetličić goal in 10th minute. In return leg, Partizan defeated Maccabi 3–1 and reached the next round. In next round, they were eliminated by Național București 0–1 on aggregate. In that season, Partizan won the title and earned a place in 1997–98 UEFA Champions League. In the first qualifying round, they were eliminated by Croatia Zagreb 1–5 on aggregate. In the first match in Belgrade, Partizan defeated their opponent by Dragan Isailović goal in 84th minute, but lost in Zagreb 0–5 and experienced one of the biggest losses in history on the European scene.

The 1998–99 season was one of the most successful during the 1990s. Partizan reached the second round of the UEFA Cup Winners' Cup. In qualifying round, Partizan eliminated Dinamo Batumi 2–1 on aggregate and Newcastle United 2–2 on away goals rule in the first round. In second round, they were eliminated by Lazio 2–3 on aggregate.

The new beginning (2000–2009) 
In 2000–01 season, in qualifying round, Partizan eliminated Sliema Wanderers 5–3 on aggregate. The first match Silema won 2–1, but in return leg Partizan won 4–1 and secured place in first round of UEFA Cup. In first round they were drawn with Porto. The first match in Belgrade has ended 1–1, but in return leg Dragons won 1–0 and eliminated Partizan. In 2001–02 season, in qualifying round, Partizan eliminated Santa Coloma 8–1 on aggregate. Partizan won 7–1 in return leg in Belgrade and made one of the biggest victories in club history on European scene. In first round, Partizan defeated Rapid Wien 1–0 in first match, but Rapid won the return leg 5–1 in Vienna, and Partizan were again eliminated in the first round. Partizan defeated Hammarby IF 5–1 on aggregate in second qualifying round for 2002–03 UEFA Champions League, but lost 1–6 on aggregate in third qualifying round from Bayern Munich. Partizan then continued European story in UEFA Cup. In first round of UEFA Cup, they eliminated Sporting CP 6–4 on aggregate. Partizan won first match in Lisbon 3–1 and draw the second leg 3–3 at home.  In first match of second round, Partizan defeated Slavia Prague 3–1, but Slavia won in return leg 1–5 in Prague and Partizan failed to reach final phase.

The club's management took the 2003 season very seriously, appointing as its new coach the former World Player of the Year Lothar Matthäus, and brought some top and experienced players like Taribo West from 1.FC Kaiserslautern, Ljubinko Drulović from Benfica and Tomasz Rząsa from Feyenoord. For the first time in its history, the club played in the UEFA Champions League after eliminating Bobby Robson's Newcastle United. In Belgrade, Partizan lost by 0–1, but in a rematch at St James' Park, they won by Ivica Iliev's goal in regular time and reached the group stages after a penalty shoot-out. Later on, Partizan was drawn in a tough group with Real Madrid (the previous year's Champions League semi-finalist), Porto (the winner of the 2002–03 UEFA Cup and the eventual winner of the competition) and Marseille (the eventual runners-up of the 2003–04 UEFA Cup). The Partizan Stadium was a tough ground for the opposition and the team did not lost a home game, playing out a 0–0 draw with Real Madrid's famous Galácticos, which included players such as Zinedine Zidane, Ronaldo, Luís Figo, Roberto Carlos, Raúl and David Beckham; a 1–1 draw with Porto, led by coach José Mourinho; and Marseille, with its superstars Fabien Barthez and Didier Drogba, while playing some inspired football in the away match in Madrid (0–1), Marseille (0–3) and Porto (1–2). They are the first, and so far the only, Serbian team to qualify for the main draw of this elite European club competition since its inception in 1992.

Also great success was achieved in 2004–05 season, when Partizan reached round of 16 in UEFA Cup. The Steamroller started this wonderful European story in second qualifying round, where they were drawn against Romanian team Oţelul Galaţi. After a goalless draw in the first leg in Constanţa, Partizan eliminated opponent two weeks later, in Belgrade, by Srđan Radonjić's goal in 29th minute. Partizan defeated Dinamo București in first round 3–1 on aggregate and securing place in group stage. They were drawn into the Group E alongside Middlesbrough, Villarreal, Lazio and Egaleo. On 4 November 2004, the team played its first match in the group stage of the UEFA Cup and beat 4–0 Egaleo at home. Three weeks later, Partizan draw 2–2 with Lazio in Rome. Partizan lead 2–0 by Pierre Boya's twice after 25 minutes, but Lazio with two goals in second half avoided defeat. In third match, Partizan draw 1–1 with Villarreal at home and secured place into round of 32. The goal for Partizan on that match scored Ivan Tomić from penalty spot in 65th minute. In last match, Partizan lost in Middlesbrough 0–3. On 16 February 2005, Partizan draw 2–2 with Dnipro Dnipropetrovsk at home in first match of round of 32. Obiora Odita scored twice for Steamroller in first half. In return leg, Partizan made great victory in Dnipropetrovsk and reached round of 16. In 88th minute, Miroslav Radović scored one of the most important goals in history of the club. Later on, he was eliminated (1–1 in Belgrade, 0–2 in Krasnodar) by CSKA Moscow, the eventual winner of the competition.

In second qualifying round, Partizan beat 2–0 on aggregate Sheriff Tiraspol and lost on penalty spot from Artmedia Petržalka in third qualifying round for the 2005–06 UEFA Champions League. In first round for 2005–06 UEFA Cup, Partizan was eliminated from Maccabi Petah Tikva, 4–5 on aggregate and did not reach group stage.

After one year, Partizan reached again group stage of UEFA Cup. They eliminated Maribor and Groningen in the qualifying phase. In the group stage, Partizan were drawn against Rangers, Maccabi Haifa, Livorno and Auxerre. They lost three out of four games, only drew with Livorno at home.

In August 2007, Partizan suffered a real shock: UEFA expelled Partizan from the 2007–08 UEFA Cup season and fined the club €30,056 due to crowd trouble at their away qualifying match against Zrinjski Mostar, which forced the match to be interrupted for ten minutes. UEFA judged travelling Partizan fans to have been the culprits of the trouble, but Partizan were allowed to play the return leg while the appeal was being processed. Partizan's appeal, however, was rejected and Zrinjski Mostar qualified for the next round, although Partizan beat them by an aggregate score of 11–1.

Partizan started their 2008–09 European campaign in the second qualifying round of the 2008–09 UEFA Champions League with a 3–1 aggregate victory over Inter Baku. In the third qualifying round, Partizan were eliminated by Fenerbahçe, with an aggregate score of 3–4. In the UEFA Cup first round, Partizan defeated Timișoara 3–1 on aggregate and secured place in group stage. They were drawn into the Group C alongside Sevilla, Stuttgart, Sampdoria and Standard Liège. Partizan lost all four matches and score only one goal. That goal score Lamine Diarra in first match of the group stage, against Sampdoria in Belgrade.

Second time in Champions League and group stages of new Europa League (2009–2015)
In second qualifying round, Partizan beat 12–0 on aggregate Rhyl. In return leg, Partizan beat Rhyl 8–0 and that's the club's greatest victory in European competitions. Partizan lost against APOEL 1–2 on aggregate (0–2 defeat in Nicosia, 1–0 victory in Belgrade) in third qualifying round for the 2009–10 UEFA Champions League. In play-off round for 2009–10 UEFA Europa League, Partizan defeat 3–1 on aggregate Slovak Champion MŠK Žilina and reach group stage for the second season in a row. They were drawn into the Group J alongside Shakhtar Donetsk, Club Brugge and Toulouse. They lost five out of six games, only won with Shakhtar Donetsk at home 1–0 in last match of the group, by Lamine Diarra goal in 6th minute.

After the unsuccessful attempts in the previous seasons, Partizan finally reached the group stages of the Champions League in the 2010–11 season. They eliminated Pyunik, HJK Helsinki and Anderlecht in the qualifying phase. Partizan previously qualified for the group stages only once, in the 2003–04 season. Now, the draw for the group phase decided that Partizan will play in group H, alongside Arsenal, Shakhtar Donetsk (the winner of the 2008–09 UEFA Cup) and Sporting Braga (the eventual runner-up of the 2010–11 UEFA Europa League). On the matchday 1, Partizan lost against Shakhtar on Donbass Arena in Donetsk (0–1). Next game Partizan played against Arsenal at Partizan Stadium and lost 1–3 after they played inspired football with a 10-man team in the last 30 minutes of the match. In two matches against Sporting Braga, Partizan failed to score and they lost both games (0–2 in Braga; 0–1 in Belgrade). The last two rounds in the group have also brought inspired football, but unfortunately it wasn't enough so Shakhtar Donetsk and The Gunners defeated Partizan once again, 0–3 in Belgrade and 1–3 at the Emirates Stadium.

Partizan defeated Shkëndija in the second qualifying round for 2011–12 UEFA Champions League 5–0 on aggregate and were eliminated in the third qualifying round by Genk 3–2 on aggregate. In the play-off round for the 2011–12 UEFA Europa League, Partizan was eliminated by Shamrock Rovers, 3–2 on aggregate and did not reach group stage.

Partizan started their 2012–13 European campaign in the second qualifying round of the 2012–13 UEFA Champions League with a 7–2 aggregate victory over Valletta from Malta. In the third qualifying round, Partizan lost and continued their European season play-off round of the Europa League. In the play-off round, they were eliminated Tromsø and reached group stage. They were drawn into the Group H alongside Internazionale, Rubin Kazan and Neftçi. They obtained three points in six games after a draw against Rubin Kazan and two times against Neftçi.

In second qualifying round for 2013–14 UEFA Champions League Partizan eliminated Shirak (1–1, away goal) and lost against Ludogorets Razgrad (1–3 on aggregate). In play-off round for 2013–14 UEFA Europa League, Partizan played with Thun. Partizan beat Thun 1–0 in Belgrade, but lost 0–3 in Thun and failed to get in Europa League. Without a single trophy and group stage of some European competition, the season was the worst in last ten years in every way.

After a year of absence, Partizan entered at the 2014–15 UEFA Europa League by beating Neftçi total score 5–3 (3–2 at home and 2–1 away). Partizan is after the draw, placed in Group C with Tottenham Hotspur, Beşiktaş and Asteras Tripoli. Partizan began the Europa League in excellent form and remained undefeated against the English giant Tottenham, but in the next four games, the club were defeated. In last match of the group stage, Partizan played a match without goals with Asteras. Partizan scored only one goal in six matches. That one goal score Saša Marković against Beşiktaş on Atatürk Olympic Stadium in Istanbul.

Recent years (2015–)
The 2015–16 season for Partizan was started on 14 July 2015 by defeating the Georgian team Dila Gori 1–0 in the second round of qualifying for the Champions League. Partizan also won in the return leg (2–0). In the third round Partizan played against Steaua București. In first leg, Partizan remained undefeated in Bucharest (1–1). In return leg, Partizan lost 1–2 at the half-time, and then incredible return on goals by Marko Jevtović, Andrija Živković and Nikola Trujić come to a positive result (4–2) and The Steamroller reach play-off the Champions League after 5 years. In the draw for the play–off for the Champions League, Partizan pulled BATE Borisov. In the first leg in Barysaw, Partizan played second half with a player less and lost 1–0. In return leg, Partizan won 2–1 but BATE qualify for the Champions League on away goals. After falling out of the play–off for the Champions League, Partizan has directly entered the Europa League. Partizan is after the draw, placed in Group L with Athletic Bilbao, AZ Alkmaar and Augsburg. Partizan made three victories in group stage (3–2 at home and 2–1 in away against AZ and 3–1 in Augsburg against same team), but he failed to get in Round of 32. The first victory in group stage, on 17 September against AZ, was first Partizan's victory in group stage of some European competition since 16 December 2009 when the Partizan won against Shakhtar Donetsk 1–0 in Europa League group stage. In group stage Partizan score ten goals and that's exactly like in last three seasons when Partizan score same goals like in this. Nine out of ten goals, has score Aboubakar Oumarou (5) and Andrija Živković (4), and the last one score Fabrício.

On 14 July 2016, Partizan opened season with a 0–0 home draw against Zagłębie Lubin in second qualifying round for the 2016–17 UEFA Europa League. A week later, in Lubin, after penalty drama Partizan was eliminated.

Partizan began their 2017–18 European campaign in the second qualifying round of the 2017–18 UEFA Champions League, eliminating Montenegrin champions Budućnost Podgorica 2–0 on aggregate. In the third qualifying round Partizan were eliminated by Greek champions Olympiacos, losing 1–3 in Belgrade and drawing 2–2 in Piraeus. In play-off round for 2017–18 UEFA Europa League, Partizan played against Videoton and ex coach Marko Nikolić who won the double in previous season. After 0–0 in Belgrade, Partizan destroyed Videoton 4–0 in Felcsút and reached the group stage. They were drawn into the Group B alongside Dynamo Kyiv, Young Boys and Skënderbeu Korçë. Partizan began the Europa League group stage in Bern and remained undefeated against Young Boys (1–1) at Stade de Suisse. In second match, Partizan lost 2–3 against Dynamo Kyiv in Belgrade. In third match, Partizan and Skënderbeu played a match without goals in Elbasan. On 2 November, Partizan beat Skënderbeu 2-0 and catch up first victory in group stage, thanks to goals by Zoran Tošić and Léandre Tawamba. On 23 November, Partizan defeated Young Boys 2–1, thanks to goals by Léandre Tawamba and Ognjen Ožegović and qualified for the Europa League Round of 32 for the first time after 2004–05 season. In last match of the group, Partizan lost in Kyiv 1–4. Marko Jevtović score only goal for Partizan, from penalty spot. In round of 32, Partizan was eliminated by Viktoria Plzeň, 1–3 on aggregate.

Partizan began their 2018–19 European campaign in the first qualifying round of the 2018–19 UEFA Europa League, eliminating Montenegrin Rudar Pljevlja 6–0 on aggregate. In the second and third qualifying round, Partizan eliminate Lithuanian Trakai (2–1 on aggregate) and Denmark Nordsjælland (5–3 on aggregate). In play-off round, Partizan were eliminated by Beşiktaş. After 1–1 in Belgrade, Partizan lost 0–3 in Istanbul and failed to reach the group stage.

In July and August 2019, Partizan secured their ninth participation in the group stage of UEFA Europa League. Under Savo Milošević's leadership, Partizan knocked-out Connah's Quay Nomads F.C. (1–0 victory (A) and 3–0 victory at home), Yeni Malatyaspor (3–1 victory in first match, in Belgrade and 0–1 defeat in Turkey) and Molde FK(2–1 at home and 1–1 in Norway) in the qualifiers. On 19 September, Partizan opened the group stage campaign with a 2–2 home draw against AZ. Due to UEFA sanctions, this game was played behind the closed doors with only U15s allowed to attend - official attendance at the game was 22,564. Partizan beat Astana (2–1 away) on matchday 2, but lost the two following games against Manchester United (0–1 in Belgrade and 3–0 in Manchester). They still managed to draw in Alkmaar against AZ (2–2) and beat Astana 4–1 at home on the last two games of the group. However, this wasn't enough to get through as they finished third in the group just one point behind AZ.

Records
Biggest ever home victory: against  Rhyl 8–0 (21 July 2009, second qualifying round for Champions League)
Biggest ever away victory: against  Slavia Sofia 5–0 (12 October 1988, UEFA Cup first round)
Biggest ever home defeat: against  Beşiktaş 0–4 (23 October 2014, UEFA Europa League group stage)
Biggest ever away defeat: against  Dynamo Dresden 0–6 (30 September 1970, Inter-Cities Fairs Cup first round)

Matches
Only official matches included (European Cup / Champions League, Cup Winners' Cup, UEFA Cup / Europa League, Conference League and Inter-Cities Fairs Cup matches).

Scorers

SFR Yugoslavia era (1955–1992)

FR Yugoslavia / Serbia and Montenegro era (1992–2006)

Serbia era (2006–present)

Penalty shoot-out history

Mitropa Cup
The Mitropa Cup, officially called the La Coupe de l'Europe Centrale or Central European Cup, was one of the first international major European football cups for club sides. After World War II in 1951 a replacement tournament named Zentropa Cup was held, but just for one season, the Mitropa Cup name was revived, and again in 1958 the name of tournament changed in Danube Cup but only for one season. The tournament declined and was discontinued after 1992.

The greatest success was achieved in 1977–78 season, when they won the competition.

Goals in UEFA competitions

Top scorers in UEFA competitions

As of 17 February 2023

Hat-tricks

4 Player scored four goals

Hat-tricks by opponent

4 Player scored four goals

Own goals by opponent

Own goals by Partizan players

Overall record

By country 

As of 24 February 2023

UEFA Team ranking

As of 9 December 2021.

Notes and references

External links
  
 FK Partizan at UEFA.com

Europe
Partizan
Partizan